Örtülü is a village in the Ardanuç District, Artvin Province, Turkey. Its population is 56 (2021).

References

Villages in Ardanuç District